Wahlsburg is an unincorporated community in Brown County, in the U.S. state of Ohio.

History
A post office was established at Wahlsburg in 1879, and remained in operation until 1903. The community was named for Peter Wahl, the first postmaster.

References

Unincorporated communities in Brown County, Ohio
1879 establishments in Ohio
Populated places established in 1879
Unincorporated communities in Ohio